Paulus Moses (born 4 June 1978) is a Namibian professional boxer who held the WBA (Regular) lightweight title from 2009 to 2010. He retired on 20 October 2018, shortly after losing his WBO Africa middleweight fight in Accra, Ghana.

Professional career

WBA lightweight champion
On 3 January 2009 Moses fought against the WBA Lightweight champion Yusuke Kobori in Pacifico Yokohama in Kanagawa Prefecture Yokohama City in Japan. Moses won the fight on points and became the new world champion. Moses defended that title on 25 July 2009 by unanimous decision over Takehiro Shimada.

Losing the title and subsequent fights
The hitherto undefeated Moses was knocked out by challenger Miguel Acosta by a sixth-round knockout on 30 May 2010. A comeback fight against Argentine pugilist Roberto David Arrieta was scheduled for 6 November 2010, in Ongwediva.

WBO lightweight title challenge
Moses was scheduled to challenge newly installed WBO Lightweight champion, Ricky Burns for Burns' title on 10 March 2012. This was to be a return to Burns' homeland with the fight being held in Braehead Arena, Glasgow. Moses’ trainer and promoter Nestor ‘Sunshine’ Tobias said that his fighter, blessed with electric speed and a powerful left hook, planned to cut his rival’s newfound supreme status short.

Professional boxing record

References

External links

Hitman Set to Fight thenamibian.com, 9 November 2007

1978 births
Living people
People from Omusati Region
Sportspeople from Windhoek
Lightweight boxers
Namibian male boxers
World lightweight boxing champions
World Boxing Association champions